"Kapcsolat" concert was an annual open-air free concert event between 1997 and 2011 in Budapest, Hungary. The open-air concert was considered to be one of the largest in Europe.

The name of the concert was borrowed from the motto of the mobile network operator Westel: "", while its approximate date from the telephone prefix of the operator (06-30, also dubbed ""). The concert was free and paid for from sponsorships. It attracted hundreds of thousand concert-goers. Tickets were only given to VIP guests and employees of Magyar Telekom to VIP sectors.

The first concert was organized in 1996, however, the name "Kapcsolat" was used only from 1997. It was held annually until 2011. In 2012, new telecommunication taxes were introduced, and the concert was called off due to budgetary reasons.

Events

References

Music festivals in Hungary
Culture in Budapest
Recurring events established in 1997
Recurring events disestablished in 2011